Sunner Khurd is a village in Jalandhar district of Punjab State, India. The village is administrated by Sarpanch, as an elected representative of the village.

Transport 

References 

Villages in Jalandhar district